Sir Richard Newman 1st Baronet  MP JP DL (c. 1675-1721), of Evercreech Park, was MP for Milborne Port in 1701.

Background
Sir Richard Newman Bt was the eldest son of Richard Newman of Evercreech Park and Fifehead. He was educated at Sherborne, and Pembroke College, Oxford.

Family life
On 1 June 1696 Sir Richard Newman married Frances, daughter of Sir Thomas Samwell, 1st Bt, and had three sons and four daughters.

References

1670s births
1721 deaths
English MPs 1701
People educated at Sherborne School
Baronets in the Baronetage of England
Alumni of Pembroke College, Oxford